Thomas Michael Cousineau (born May 6, 1957) is an American former college and professional football player who was a linebacker in the Canadian Football League (CFL) and National Football League (NFL) for nine seasons during the 1970s and 1980s.  He played college football for Ohio State University, and twice earned All-American honors.  He was the first overall pick of the 1979 NFL Draft, and played professionally for the CFL's Montreal Alouettes and the NFL's Cleveland Browns and San Francisco 49ers.

Cousineau is a member of the College Football Hall of Fame, elected in the class of 2016. He is also a member of the Ohio State Varsity "O" Hall of Fame, inducted in 1995, and St. Edward High School Hall of Fame. Cousineau was the recipient of the Silver Anniversary Butkus Award in 2003.

Early years
Cousineau was born in Fairview Park, Ohio, to Carol and Tom Cousineau Sr, who was the head football and a wrestling coach at Lakewood (Ohio) High School. Consequently, his mother did not want him to play football under the shadow of his father. Thus, Cousineau played high school football for nearby St. Edward High School, which is several blocks away in Lakewood. He excelled and was one of the most highly recruited football players in the country in his senior year. He graduated in 1975.

Cousineau was also an accomplished wrestler. In 1975, under legendary coach Howard Ferguson, he lost to future NFL player Bob Golic from cross-town all-boys school rival St. Joseph High School in the Ohio state wrestling tournament semifinals in the heavyweight weight class. The match has been called "one of the most memorable," Golic would go on to win the state title and Cousineau would finish in third place. Golic would go to be two-time All-American at heavyweight at Notre Dame. Cousineau and Golic would eventually become teammates in the NFL with the Browns.

College football career
Cousineau attended Ohio State University, where he played for legendary coach Woody Hayes' Ohio State Buckeyes football team from 1975 to 1978. During that span, Ohio State had an overall record of 36-10-2 and 28–4 in the Big Ten, were three-time Big Ten champs. The Buckeyes played four bowl games after each of the seasons he played: in the Rose Bowl, Orange Bowl, Sugar Bowl and Gator Bowl. They were a Top 5 team for 36 weeks over these four years and the No. 1 team in the nation for eight weeks in 1975, and ultimately finished fourth, sixth and 12th in the final Associated Press polls in 1975, 1976 and 1977, respectively.

Cousineau majored in marketing. He was a consensus first-team All-American, breaking the school record with 211 tackles in a single season in 1978, an average of 17.5 a game.  He also broke the school record for most tackles in a game with 29 against Penn State in 1978, and was the MVP of the 1977 Orange Bowl.

Cousineau's last game for the Buckeyes was the infamous 1978 Gator Bowl against Clemson, during which Coach Hayes punched Clemson linebacker Charlie Bauman in the final minutes of the game. Hayes was fired the following day for the incident.

Cousineau still holds many of Ohio State's tackling records. As of 2016, he holds six of the top 10 single-game tackling records, 29 single-game tackles (since tied by fellow College Football Hall of Famer Chris Spielman), most solo tackles in a single game, (16 against SMU in 1978). He also ranks second on both the all-time OSU tackle list with 569 (three behind Marcus Marek) and on the career solo tackles list with 259.

He was named an All-American in 1977 and 1978. The Chicago Tribune named him the MVP of the Big Ten in 1978. He graduated from OSU in 1979. In 2016, he became the 25th Ohio State player, along with seven Buckeye coaches, to be named to the College Football Hall of Fame.

Professional football career
Cousineau was drafted first overall in the 1979 NFL Draft by the Buffalo Bills, who acquired the pick as a part of a package of five draft picks from the San Francisco 49ers in a 1978 trade for O. J. Simpson.  However, he never played a game for the Bills. He instead signed with the Canadian Football League's Montreal Alouettes, who signed him for double the money originally offered by the Bills. Cousineau became a star for the Alouettes, becoming the Grey Cup Most Valuable Player in the 1979 season. He only played in four games in his third season because of an elbow injury while the Alouettes collapsed.

In 1982, Cousineau wanted to return to the NFL, choosing to forego two optional years with the Alouettes. The Houston Oilers attempted to sign him, but the Bills (who still held Cousineau's NFL rights) matched the offer.   
Cleveland Browns owner Art Modell had long been interested in signing him. Cousineau was then traded from the Bills to the Cleveland Browns for a first-round draft choice (14th overall) in the 1983 NFL Draft, plus a second and a third draft choice in subsequent years. That first-round pick was used on future Hall of Fame quarterback Jim Kelly. Cousineau signed a five-year contract for $2.5 million, the highest contract ever at the time by the Browns.

In 1983, Cousineau was arrested in connection with minor collision with a police car on Saint Patrick's Day He was charged with drunk driving, improperly using traffic lanes, and not having his driver's license. He was subsequently found not guilty of the drunk driving charge, but guilty of the moving violation (the driver's license charge was dropped).

During Cousineau's four seasons with the Browns, he led the team in tackles for three seasons. In the 1983 season, he intercepted 4 passes and was named a 2nd-team All-NFL by the NEA.  He was also named 2nd-team all NFL by the AP in 1984, but never made the Pro Bowl in his career. He was considered an overpaid disappointment in Cleveland, while Bills fans fondly remember the fact that the man who once snubbed them for the CFL was traded for Jim Kelly. Cousineau signed with the San Francisco 49ers as a free agent after the 1985 season where he played two years as a reserve before retiring in 1987. Cousineau finished his NFL career with ten interceptions and 6.5 career sacks.

After retiring as a player
St. Edward inducted Cousineau to the school's Athletic Hall of Fame.
He married Lisa June 16, 1990, and has 2 daughters Kyle and Kacey.
On February 8, 2006, Cousineau announced plans to run for a seat in the Ohio House of Representatives as a Republican in the Akron, Ohio area. He won the May primary but lost the November election to Democrat Brian Williams by a margin of 58% to 42%.

On April 20, 2009, Cousineau joined the St. Vincent – St. Mary High School football coaching staff as a linebackers coach.
Cousineau later went on to be the linebackers coach at St. Edward High School (Ohio)

References

External links
 Ohio State bio
 
 NFL bio

1957 births
Living people
All-American college football players
American football linebackers
Canadian football linebackers
Cleveland Browns players
National Football League first-overall draft picks
Montreal Alouettes players
Ohio State Buckeyes football players
College Football Hall of Fame inductees
Players of American football from Akron, Ohio
Players of Canadian football from Cleveland
San Francisco 49ers players
St. Edward High School (Lakewood, Ohio) alumni
National Football League replacement players
Players of American football from Cleveland